David Hasler (born 4 May 1990) is a Liechtensteiner former professional footballer who last as an attacking midfielder or striker.

Career
The most highly rated young player in Liechtenstein, Hasler signed a three-year contract with Swiss club FC Basel in 2007 after making his name at USV Eschen/Mauren in his homeland. FC Zürich and BSC Young Boys also competed for his signature. UEFA.com named him as one of the most promising youngsters of 2007. After playing for Basel's youth and reserve teams, Hasler moved to Vaduz on a transfer in 2010.

He made his international debut for the Liechtenstein U21 national team in April 2006 against Northern Ireland at 15 years and 11 months old. On 26 March 2008, Hasler was granted his first senior cap for the Liechtenstein national team against Malta.

He joined former club USV Eschen/Mauren in 2013. Following a string of injuries, Hasler announced his retirement on 8 April 2014.

Career statistics
Score and result list Liechtenstein's goal tally first, score column indicates score after Hasler goal.

References

External links
  - Profile at FC Vaduz official site

1990 births
Living people
Liechtenstein footballers
Association football midfielders
Liechtenstein international footballers
FC Vaduz players
USV Eschen/Mauren players
Liechtenstein expatriate footballers
Liechtenstein expatriate sportspeople in Switzerland
Expatriate footballers in Switzerland